Soundset Music Festival was a hip-hop music festival held yearly in the Minneapolis-Saint Paul area over Memorial Day weekend. Since Soundset began in the Metrodome parking lot in 2008, attendance has grown from 12,000 to over 30,000 consistently since 2014. Over 280,000 fans have traveled from fifty U.S states, Canada, Mexico, Puerto Rico, Costa Rica, Africa, Europe, Asia, South America, Australia and New Zealand to experience Soundset in Minnesota.

Rhymesayers Entertainment’ artists are the foundation of Soundset, with Atmosphere performing every year since the beginning. Since 2008, Soundset has had over 400 different non-repeat performers.

Soundset cancelled its concert in 2020 due to the COVID-19 pandemic.

Origin 
Two years after Rhymesayers Entertainment was first founded they hosted an event with over three dozen local underground emcees, DJs, and b-boys in a South Minneapolis warehouse. Two years later, the event became Soundset Wednesdays at First Avenue. In 2008, Soundset emerged in the Metrodome parking lot.

2019 lineup 
Lil Wayne, SZA, G-Eazy, Run the Jewels, Atmosphere, Black Star, Beast Coast, Tech N9ne, DMX, Royce da 5'9", Dessa, DJ Spinderella, Doja Cat, Just Blaze, Bas, Prof, Lil Nas X, DaBaby, Cut Chemist, Buddy, Dem Atlas, Dounia, DJ Abilities, Taylor Bennett, DJ, YBN Cordae, DV One, Tierra Whack, Sa-Roc, Epic Beard Men, B.A.G., Taylor J, Cashinova, Student 1, Dua Saleh, Kevin Beacham, DJ Precyse, Lisa Vasequez, Psymun, Mickey Breeze, DJ Keezy, Maya MIDA

Lil Uzi Vert was on the original lineup, but did not perform.

Hosts: Sway Calloway, Heather B., J.Pratt, Cros One

2018 lineup 
Logic, Migos, Atmosphere, Erykah Badu, Tyler, the Creator, Russ, Wu-Tang Clan, Brockhampton, Ice-T, A Boogie Wit Da Hoodie, Hieroglyphics, Prof, Jaden Smith, Grieves, DJ Jazzy Jeff, Murs, Young M.A., Evidence, DJ Melon, Rapsody, Westside Gunn & Conway, J.I.D, Kamaiyah, Dem Atlas, DJ Scratch, Pell, Jack Harlow, Skratch Bastid, DJ Livia, Bugus, Quincey White, The Lioness, OG Grip, Sick Trim, Willie Wonka, DJ Rowsheen, Mike 2600, DJ Bles One, Trakgirl, The Opus, MMYYKK, Bailey Cogan, DJ Ariatari, The Technics, IBrow, Booboo, Spencer Joles, Kelsey Pyro

Hosts: Sway Calloway, Heather B., J.Pratt, Cros One, Big Quarters

2017 lineup 
Travi$ Scott, Atmosphere, Lauryn Hill, Gucci Mane, T.I., Pusha T, E-40, Brother Ali, DRAM, Ty Dolla $ign, P.O.S., the Stand4rd, Kool Keith(as Dr. Octagon, Aminé, Talib Kweli, Denzel Curry, Mod Sun, Pete Rock, Dave East, 070 Shake, Sa-Roc, Peanut Butter Wolf, Stretch and Bobbito , Nazeem & Spencer Joles, Oswin Benjamin, Sophia Eris, J. Plaza, rapper, horrorshow (band), Black Liquid, DJ TIIIIIIIIIP, DJ FLEG, DJ DJ Keezy, Booka B

Kevin Gates, Mac Miller, and Lil Uzi Vert were also on the original lineup, but did not perform.

Hosts: Sway Calloway, Heather B., J.Pratt, Cros One

2016 lineup 
Atmosphere, ASAP Rocky, Future, The Roots, Common, Prof, Doomtree, Machine Gun Kelly, Danny Brown, Lizzo, LICE (Aesop Rock and Homeboy Sandman), Jay Rock, Post Malone, Anderson Paak and The Free Nationals, Raury, Murs and 9th Wonder, Pharoahe Monch, Mick Jenkins, GoldLink, Pouya, Crazy Legs of Rock Steady Crew, Domo Genesis, Blueprint, Marley Marl, DJ Jazzy Joyce, A-F-R-O, I Self Devine and Muja Messiah Present 9th House, Noname Gypsy, Finding Novyon, Lexii Alijai, Skeme Richards, Baby Shel & DJ Quincy James, Reverie, Jesse Da La Pena, DJ TIIIIIIIIIIP, and DJ Just Nine.

Hosts: Sway Calloway, Heather B., J.Pratt, Cros One

2015 lineup 
Atmosphere, J. Cole, Ice Cube, Big Sean, Ludacris, Logic, Yelawolf, Dilated Peoples, Clockwork Indigo (Flatbush Zombies and The Underachievers), Brother Ali, Vic Mensa, Aesop Rock with Rob Sonic & DJ Abilities, Dessa, DJ Jazzy Jay, Hopsin, Smif-N-Wessun, DJ Babu, Freddie Gibbs & Madlib, Vince Staples, Watsky, DJ Eclipse, Dem Atlas, DJ Supreme, B. Dolan, Father, SonReal, G.L.A.M., Chester Watson, Sa-Roc, Sean Anonymous, Manny Phesto, Freez with DJ Willie Shu, SET THE SMITH, DJ Lean Rock, DJ Stage One, DJ Adatrak, and DJ Str8reppin.

Hosts: Sway Calloway, St. Paul Slim, J.Pratt

2014 lineup 
Atmosphere, Wiz Khalifa, Nas, 2 Chainz, Cypress Hill, Earlwolf (Tyler, The Creator and Earl Sweatshirt), Chance The Rapper, Prof, Grieves, G-Eazy, Ab-Soul, DJ Qbert, The Grouch & Eligh, Flatbush Zombies, Lizzo w/ Lazerbeak, Rapsody & 9th Wonder, Shad, Dem Atlas, Snow Tha Product, Roc Marciano, Dosh, Jonwayne, D-Styles, Toki Wright & Big Cats, Will C, Allan Kingdom, Breakbeat Lou, Nacho Picasso, Freddy Fresh, Los Nativos, K. Raydio, Psynum, Mac Irv, Ecid, DJ Fundo, DJ Lean Rock, DJ D. Mil and DJ Sidereal.

Hosts: Sway Calloway, Brother Ali, J.Pratt

2013 lineup 
Atmosphere, Snoop Dogg, Mac Miller, Tech N9ne, Busta Rhymes, Brother Ali, Juicy J, P.O.S, Schoolboy Q, Aesop Rock with Rob Sonic & DJ Big Wiz. Joey Bada$$, Step Brothers (Evidence & Alchemist), Sean Price, A$AP Ferg, Dizzy Wright, Apollo Brown & Guilty Simpson, R.A. the Rugged Man, Abstract Rude & Musab, Melo D - Beat Junkies, Diamond D, Kid Koala, Skratch Bastid, Psalm One & Oh No, The Reminders, Mixed Blood Majority, The Chalice, Open Mike Eagle, Greg Grease, Haphduzn, Meta, Major G, DJ Top Speed, Dan Speak, Jimmy2Times, Verb X, DJ Mad Mardigan, DJ Lean Rock and Edison.

Hosts: Sway Calloway, Blueprint, J.Pratt

2012 lineup 
Atmosphere, Lupe Fiasco, Ghostface Killah & Raekwon, Kendrick Lamar, Aesop Rock with Rob Sonic & Dj Big Wiz, P.O.S, Macklemore & Ryan Lewis, Grieves & Budo, Danny Brown, Big K.R.I.T., Evidence, Prof with DJ Fundo, Action Bronson, DJ Premier, I Self Devine, Astronautalis, Bambu, J-Zone (DJ set), Medusa, Chief Kamachi, Grynch, Chuuwee, Paten Locke and Willie Evans Jr. are DUMBTRON, Villa Rosa (Muja Messiah & Maria Isa), The Tribe & Big Cats, Audio Perm, Long Doe (Tony Bones, DJ Big Wiz & Mike The Martyr), Auddio Draggon (Gene Poole & Xilam Balam), Tomorrow Genius, BdotCroc, DJ Stage One, DJ Kool AKIEM, LAST WORD, KidCutUp, Superbrush427, DIVINCI (of Solillaquists of Sound), Los Boogie.

Hosted by Brother Ali, MaLLy, J Pratt.

2011 lineup 
Atmosphere, Big Boi, De La Soul, Slaughterhouse (Joell Ortiz, Joe Budden, Royce da 5’9”, Crooked I), Brother Ali, Doomtree (P.O.S, Dessa, Sims, Cecil Otter, Mike Mictlan, Lazerbeak, Paper Tiger), Evidence x Rakaa-Iriscience x DJ Babu, Mac Miller, Curren$y, Blueprint, Grieves & Budo, Zion I & The Grouch, Sab The Artist, DJ Abilities, Face Candy, Edan with special guest Paten Locke, Macklemore & Ryan Lewis, Looptroop Rockers, Rubberoom, Soulcrate Music, 2Mex, Mr. Gene Poole, Qwazaar, Longshot, Mally, Desdamona, Duenday, Midwest Konnect, Rocky Diamonds, Stage One, Shortkut, Noam The Drummer, Exile, Maseo, Skeme Richards, KidCutUp and Espada.

Hosted by Toki Wright, Carnage and Kevin Beacham.

2010 lineup 
Atmosphere, Method Man & Redman, Brother Ali, Hieroglyphics featuring Del The Funky Homosapien, Souls of Mischief, Casual and Pep Love, P.O.S, Murs, Freeway & Jake One, Eyedea & Abilities, Wiz Khalifa, Cage, Rob Swift, Grieves & Budo, 45 King, People Under The Stairs, BK One, DJ Revolution, Dessa, Yelawolf, Fashawn, Themselves, Busdriver, Toki Wright, Solillaquists of Sound, Prof with Rahzwell, Cecil Otter, Dark Time Sunshine, Ernest Rhodes, A.R.M (M.anifest & Krukid), Mike Dreams, I.B.E, Ice Rod, Plain Ole Bill, Mike 2600, KidCutUp, J Pratt and DJ Anton.

Hosted by Peter Parker, Kevin Beacham and DJ Snuggles.

2009 lineup 
Atmosphere, The Pharcyde, MF Doom, Brother Ali, Freeway & Jake One, Sage Francis with B. Dolan, Immortal Technique, P.O.S, El-P with Mr. Dibbs & TMQ, Eyedea & Abilities, Abstract Rude + Aceyalone & Myka 9 = Haiku D'Etat with DJ Drez, Prince Paul, Buck 65, Blueprint with DJ Rare Groove, DJ Nu-Mark, Heiruspecs, Cunninlynguists, Blue Scholars, Sims of Doomtree, One Be Lo, I Self Devine, Awol One, Mike Mictlan & Lazerbeak = Hand Over Fist of Doomtree, Toki Wright, Grieves, Unknown Prophets, Lil Buddy Mclain, Just.Live, Kristoff Krane, El Guante, Plain Ole Bill, BK One, King Otto, and DJ Nikoless.

2008 lineup 
Atmosphere, Dilated Peoples, Aesop Rock w/ Rob Sonic and DJ Big Wiz, Little Brother, DJ Babu, Rhettmatic, J-Rocc of the World Famous Beat Junkies, Brother Ali, Eyedea & Abilities, P.O.S, Blueprint, Mac Lethal, Abstract Rude, I Self Devine, Musab, Psalm One, Grayskul, Los Nativos

References

External links 
 

Music festivals in Minnesota
Hip hop music festivals in the United States
2008 establishments in Minnesota
Music festivals established in 2008